Sakami is a small town in northern Quebec, Canada. It was founded for the Centrale La-Grande-3 hydroelectric project, and is accessible by the unpaved Trans-Taiga Road.

Communities in Nord-du-Québec